Nicola Oliva, O.S.A. (1617–1684) was a Roman Catholic prelate who served as Bishop of Cortona (1677–1684).

Biography
Nicola Oliva was born in 1617 and ordained a priest in the Order of Saint Augustine. On 22 November 1677, he was appointed during the papacy of Pope Innocent XI as Bishop of Cortona. On 30 November 1677, he was consecrated bishop by Paluzzo Paluzzi Altieri Degli Albertoni, Camerlengo of the Apostolic Chamber, with Prospero Bottini, Titular Archbishop of Myra, and Lodovico Magni, Bishop of Acquapendente, serving as co-consecrators.  He served as Bishop of Cortona until his death on 13 March 1684.

References

External links and additional sources
 (for Chronology of Bishops) 
 (for Chronology of Bishops) 

17th-century Italian Roman Catholic bishops
Bishops appointed by Pope Innocent XI
1617 births
1684 deaths
People from Siena
Augustinian bishops